A list of films produced in Pakistan before 1950: A total of 7 films were produced in the country.

1948-1949

External links
 Search Pakistani film - IMDB.com
 1 Pakistani film of 1948 - pakmag.net
 6 Pakistani films of 1949 - pakmag.net

1940s
Films
Lists of 1940s films